KeeSean Johnson (born October 9, 1996) is an American football wide receiver for the Buffalo Bills of the National Football League (NFL). He played college football at Fresno State and is the program's all-time leader in receiving yards and receptions. Johnson was drafted by the Arizona Cardinals in the sixth round of the 2019 NFL Draft.

Early life
Johnson attended and played football at Palo Alto High School, in Palo Alto, California. Johnson played for the same high school as Davante Adams, the current All Pro wide receiver for the Las Vegas Raiders, before they both played for Fresno State University.

College career
Johnson redshirted during his 2014 freshman season and only played one game at Fresno State.  In 2015, Johnson started some games. In 2016, as a sophomore, Johnson led the team in receptions, receiving yards, and receiving touchdowns.

During the 2017 season as a junior, Johnson led the team in receptions, receiving yards, and touchdowns for the second-straight season. He caught at least one pass in all 14 games, extending his streak to a program record 36 consecutive games with a catch dating back to 2015, breaking Henry Ellard’s record of 34, set from 1979–82. Johnson was named a 2017 All-Mountain West Second-Team selection.

In 2018, as a senior, Johnson led the team in receptions, receiving yards, and touchdowns for the third straight season and became the program's all-time leader in both career receptions, with 275 receptions, and career receiving yards, with 3,463 yards. For the season, Johnson was fourth in the FBS in receiving yards and fifth in receptions; among active players' careers, he ranked second and first, respectively. Johnson also extended his streak of consecutive games with a pass caught to 50. He was named an All-Mountain West Second-Team selection.

Statistics 
Source:

Professional career

Arizona Cardinals
Johnson was drafted by the Arizona Cardinals in the sixth round (174th overall) of the 2019 NFL Draft. He made his NFL debut in the Cardinals' 2019 season opener against the Detroit Lions. In the 27–27 tie, he had five receptions for 46 yards on ten targets. Johnson scored his first NFL touchdown on October 31, 2019 against San Francisco 49ers.

On September 11, 2020, Johnson was placed on the reserve/COVID-19 list, and activated 10 days later.

On August 30, 2021, Johnson was waived by the Cardinals.

Philadelphia Eagles
On September 2, 2021, Johnson was signed to the Philadelphia Eagles practice squad. He was placed on the COVID list on January 1, 2022 and activated four days later.

San Francisco 49ers
On January 26, 2022, Johnson signed a reserve/future contract with the San Francisco 49ers. He was waived on August 15, 2022.

Atlanta Falcons
On August 17, 2022, Johnson signed with the Atlanta Falcons. He was waived on August 30.

Buffalo Bills
On October 11, 2022, Johnson was signed to the practice squad of the Buffalo Bills. He signed a reserve/future contract on January 23, 2023.

Personal life
Johnson has admitted that he was not named after former NFL receiver Keyshawn Johnson, though KeeSean has met Keyshawn before. Coincidentally, both KeeSean and Keyshawn have worn jersey number 19 in the NFL.

References

External links
Atlanta Falcons bio
Fresno State Bulldogs bio

1996 births
Living people
American football wide receivers
Arizona Cardinals players
Atlanta Falcons players
Buffalo Bills players
Fresno State Bulldogs football players
Palo Alto High School alumni
People from East Palo Alto, California
Philadelphia Eagles players
Players of American football from California
San Francisco 49ers players
Sportspeople from the San Francisco Bay Area